This is a list of people who have served as Vice-Admiral of Suffolk. Prior to 1594 the office holder was also Vice-Admiral of Norfolk.
Sir William Gonson 1536–1544
Sir William Woodhouse 1554–1564 jointly with
Sir Thomas Woodhouse 1554–1572 and
Henry Woodhouse 1563–1579
William Heydon 1579–? jointly with
Christopher Heydon 1579–?
Sir Robert Southwell 1585–1594
Sir Michael Stanhope 1595 – 1621/22 jointly with
Sir Lionel Tollemache, 2nd Baronet bef. 1619 – 1640
Sir William Playters, 2nd Baronet 1640–1649
Sir Henry Mildmay 1644–1650 (Parliamentary)
William Heveningham 1650–1656
English Interregnum
Sir Henry Felton, 2nd Baronet 1660–1683
Sir Thomas Allin, 2nd Baronet 1683–1692
Sir Robert Rich, 2nd Baronet 1692–1699
Sir Charles Rich, 3rd Baronet 1699–1702
Lionel Tollemache, 3rd Earl of Dysart 1702–1705
Charles FitzRoy, 2nd Duke of Grafton 1705–1757
vacant
Francis Ingram-Seymour-Conway, 2nd Marquess of Hertford 1822
Francis Seymour-Conway, 3rd Marquess of Hertford 1822–1842
vacant
John Rous, 2nd Earl of Stradbroke 1844–1886
vacant
George Rous, 3rd Earl of Stradbroke 1890–1947

References
Institute of Historical Research

Suffollk
Vice Admiral
Military history of Suffolk